Twilight Investigation is a 2010 TVB modern drama series.

Synopsis
Former police officer Yip Kwok Cheung (Bill Chan) has set up a private detective agency. Members of the team have their own strengths. Gei On Gui (Wong Hei) (known best as Encore) is the most important member who specializes in careful thought and sharp deconstruction of dialysis. The team has solved many cases of crime.

Because of investigating an adultery case, Encore is acquainted with the pseudo model, Chung Yee Tak (Linda Chung) (also known as Dak Chai). Yee Tak was born in an incomplete family, and is withdrawn. This makes her frustrated in both love and work. After breaking up with her boyfriend, she becomes drunk and is a victim of a car accident she causes, and dies. Unknown to herself that she is dead, she tries to find her separated mother so she finds Encore to help her. Encore sympathizes with Yee Tak and tries his best to find Yee Tak's mother, but during the investigation, he discovers a secret about Yee Tak's mother that even Yee tak doesn't know......

Cast

Wui Chun Investigation Company

Police

Gei's family

Chung's family

Cases

A Jewellery Businessman's Affair (Chapter 1)

Rich businessman love murders (Chapter 2 - 6)

Mystery of Yau Sam-mei's Identity (Chapter 7 - 9)

Mystery of the Studio Ghost (Chapter 10 - 12)

Lee Kwok-pang Murder (Chapter 12 - 16)

Hotel Arson and Brick Attack Cases (Chapter 2 - 4, 17 - 20)

Others

Awards and nominations

2011 TVB Anniversary Awards
 Nominated: Best Drama

My Astor On Demand Favourites Awards 2011
 Won: My Favourite Supporting Actor (Raymond Wong)

Viewership ratings

References

External links

TVB.com Twilight Investigation - Official Website 

TVB dramas
2010 Hong Kong television series debuts
2010 Hong Kong television series endings